Tacoma Stars can mean various soccer teams from the United States:

Tacoma Stars (1983–92), a defunct team that played in the original Major Indoor Soccer League
Tacoma Stars (2003–), a team currently in the Western Indoor Soccer League and the Major Arena Soccer League that began play in 2003